Altes Stadttheater Eichstätt is a theatre in Eichstätt, Bavaria, Germany.

Theatres in Bavaria